IPB can refer to one of the following:

Bogor Agricultural University (Institut Pertanian Bogor), an agricultural institute in Indonesia
Intelligence preparation of the battlespace, US Field Manual FM 3.05-301
International Peace Bureau
Investiční a poštovní banka, Czech bank
Invision Power Board
 UK Investigatory Powers Bill
Isolated-phase bus
Italian Peoples Bakery, a bakery based in Trenton, New Jersey
Leibniz Institute of Plant Biochemistry, research institute in Halle, Germany
Presbyterian Church of Brazil (Igreja Presbiteriana do Brasil), a Brazilian Protestant church
UPLB Institute of Plant Breeding at the University of the Philippines, Los Baños
 IPB compression, a method of video compression using I-frames, P-frames and B-frames